is a Japanese light novel series written by Hajime Asano and illustrated by Seiji Kikuchi. Media Factory published twelve volumes of the series from November 2009 to July 2012 under their MF Bunko J imprint. A manga adaptation illustrated by NEET was serialized in Media Factory's seinen manga magazine, Comic Alive from July 2010 to November 2013. A spin-off manga series titled  was serialized in Kadokawa Shoten's magazine Nyantype from November 2010 to October 2011. An anime television series adaptation by Feel aired in Japan from July to September 2011. The anime is licensed by Sentai Filmworks in North America.

Plot
The story revolves around Kinjirō Sakamachi, a 16-year-old high school boy who suffers from gynophobia (abnormal fear of women), which makes his nose bleed every time he has physical contact with a female. While using the men's washroom, he accidentally discovers that the popular and handsome butler Subaru Konoe is in fact a girl. Now that Kinjirō knows about Subaru's secret, he must work together with Subaru and her sadistic mistress, Kanade Suzutsuki, to protect Subaru's secret from being discovered.

Characters

A second-year high school student who discovers Subaru's secret. Frequently referred to simply as Jirō, he suffers gynophobia in which his nose bleeds whenever a girl touches him. 

A second-year high school student who works as a butler for the Suzutsuki family and suffers from aichmophobia. When she was young she was noted to be antisocial and was not close to anyone, which worried her mother. She dresses like a male due to family circumstances where one of the family has to serve Kanade's family as a butler. 

The daughter and only child of the high school's principal, who appears to behave as a rich man's polite and elegant daughter should, but is revealed to be quite sadistic. She is shown to enjoy tormenting and teasing Kinjirō by using his gynophobia against him. She does, however, give serious thought to finding a way to cure his gynophobia although her methods tend to be overly complicated or humiliate him in some way and she does not deny that she finds them amusing. 

Kureha is Kinjirō's younger sister who is a first-year in high school and loves wrestling. She is a member of the handcrafting club. After watching and following Kinjirō and Subaru, believing him a male pervert cross-dresser, she attacks Subaru to reclaim Kinjirō, only to be quickly defeated. After this incident, and still believing Subaru to be male, she falls in love with Subaru, much to Kinjirō's chagrin. 

Usami is a member of the Shooting Star Subaru-Sama fan club (or the S4), but quit afterward and is also a member of the handcrafting club. She is shown to have considerable leg power which she uses in the form of kicks. She is also shown to be a good cook, partly because she lives on her own and has to cook her own meals. 

The cat-eared student that is spying Kinjirō and Subaru. She is a busty first-year and a member of the crafts club along with Kureha, she is also revealed to be the chairman of the "Let's warmly protect Subaru-Sama committee" (Serve Subaru Observational Committee in the English dub) and is shown to have a fetish for glasses and boy love, which is expressed through her manga drawing of Kinjirō and Subaru, much to their chagrin. 

Subaru's father, head butler of the Suzutsuki family and Kanade's father's butler. He is shown to loathe Kinjirō, partly because Subaru ends up explaining that he accidentally groped her, and is suspicious of his intentions towards Subaru. 

Kinjirō and Kureha's father and their mother's coach. He suffered at her hands much as Kinjirō does at his sister's. Before dying from an illness, he asked Kinjirō to become a good man. Kinjirō uses his name so that no one will make a fun of his full name.

Schrodinger is Nakuru's older sister and only appears in the manga series. She has been shown to be very protective of her younger sister and excels in sports. After hearing about him dating her sister, she challenges Kinjirō to a series of events during the sports festival. 

Kinjirō and Kureha's mother and female pro wrestler. She is called "Queen of Knockouts". She has beaten everyone she has sparred with and now no one wants to face her, so she travels around the world fighting dangerous animals.

Media

Novels
The first volume of the novel was published on November 25, 2009. Twelve volumes of the novel were published in all by Media Factory under their MF Bunko J imprint.

Manga

The manga adaptation began its serialization on July 27, 2010 in the Media Factory's seinen manga magazine, Comic Alive. The series was collected into seven manga volumes, published under the Alive Comics imprint. On February 29, 2012, it was announced that the manga would be licensed in English by Seven Seas Entertainment. In all seven volumes were released from December 11, 2012, to September 2, 2014. The series has also been licensed in Taiwan and released through Sharp Point Press. 

A spin-off manga of the series titled  was published in Kadokawa Shoten's bishōjo magazine, Nyantype.

Anime

The anime television series was produced by Feel and directed by Keiichiro Kawaguchi. It was broadcast on the Tokyo Broadcasting System from July 7 to September 29, 2011.

Reception
Theron Martin of Anime News Network criticized the series for its indistinguishable animation and for not deviating away enough from its given genre, but concluded that "[I]t delivers just enough on its humor, character development, fan service, and charm to be entertaining, however, and for series like this, that's enough."

References

External links
Official light novel website 
Official anime website 
TBS's official anime website 

2009 Japanese novels
2011 Japanese television series debuts
Anime and manga based on light novels
Cross-dressing in anime and manga
Feel (animation studio)
Kadokawa Dwango franchises
Kadokawa Shoten manga
Light novels
Media Factory manga
MF Bunko J
Romance anime and manga
Seinen manga
Sentai Filmworks
Seven Seas Entertainment titles
TBS Television (Japan) original programming
Television shows based on light novels